Light of the World ( Phṓs tou kósmou) is a phrase Jesus used to describe himself and his disciples in the New Testament. The phrase is recorded in the Gospels of Matthew (5:14–16) and John (8:12). It is closely related to the parables of Salt and Light and Lamp under a bushel, which also appear in Jesus' Sermon on the Mount.

Gospel accounts

Referring to himself
In  Jesus applies the title to himself while debating with the Jews and states:

 

When I am in the world, I am the Light of the World.

This episode leads into  where Jesus metaphorically explains that he came to this world, so that the blind may see.

In the Christological context, the use of the title Light of the World is similar to the Bread of Life title in  where Jesus states: "I am the bread of life: he who comes to me shall not hunger." These assertions build on the Christological theme of  where Jesus claims to possess life just as the Father does and provide it to those who follow him.

Those who have faith through him will have eternal life. In John's Gospel, "darkness is present in the absence of light; the absence of eternal life," and darkness referring to death, spiritually.

Referring to his disciples
Jesus also used that term to refer to his disciples in Matthew 5:14:

Johannine Dualism

Light and darkness in John's Gospel is an antithesis that has symbolic meaning and is essential to understanding the author of John. The fourth gospel expresses certain ideas using the antithesis more frequently than any other writings in the New Testament. The Johannine community may have borrowed the symbolic use of the antithesis Light–Darkness from Essene literature, "which considered History as a permanent conflict between Good and Evil, using Light as a symbol of Truth and Righteousness and Darkness as that of Falsehood and Evil".

Examples of dualistic concepts in the Gospel of John:

Extra-biblical sources
In the extra-canonical Gospel of Thomas, a used similar phrase appears, "There is light within a man of light, and he lights up the whole world. If he does not shine, he is darkness".

Light is also a recurring theme in Gnostic religions such as Manichaeism and Mandaeism.

See also
 Divine light
 I am (biblical term)
 
 Jesus in Christianity
 Life of Jesus in the New Testament

References

External links

Sayings of Jesus
New Testament words and phrases
Gospel of John
World
Sermon on the Mount